Sean Thomas Brady (born November 23, 1992) is an American mixed martial artist who competes in the Welterweight division of the Ultimate Fighting Championship. As of March 7, 2023, he is #9 in the UFC welterweight rankings.

Background
Brady was born and raised in Burholme, Philadelphia. While studying at Swenson Arts and Technology High School to become an auto mechanic, Brady started training Muay Thai, subsequently also picking up Brazilian jiu-jitsu.

Mixed martial arts career

Early career

Spending most of his time in the Cage Fury Fighting Championship, Brady compiled an undefeated 10–0 pro record. Along the way, Brady captured the Welterweight title with a submission win over Mike Jones. Brady then defended his 170-pound championship with a fourth-round knockout over Taj Abdul-Hakim. After this performance, he was given a UFC contract.

Ultimate Fighting Championship

In his UFC debut, Brady faced Court McGee on October 18, 2019 at UFC on ESPN 6. He won the fight via a unanimous decision.

Brady faced Ismail Naurdiev on February 29, 2020 at UFC Fight Night 169. He won the fight via unanimous decision.

Brady faced Christian Aguilera at UFC Fight Night: Smith vs. Rakić on August 29, 2020. He won the fight via a guillotine choke in round two. This win earned him the Performance of the Night award.

Brady was expected to face Belal Muhammad on December 19, 2020 at UFC Fight Night 185. However in late October, Brady had a broken nose and had to pull out of their bout.

Brady faced Jake Matthews on March 6, 2021 at UFC 259. He won the fight via a submission in round three.

Brady was scheduled to face Kevin Lee on July 10, 2021 at UFC 264. However, Lee withdrew due to injury and the bout was rescheduled to UFC on ESPN 30 on August 28, 2021. Subsequently, the bout was yet again cancelled after Brady withdrew due to a foot infection.

Brady faced Michael Chiesa on November 20, 2021 at UFC Fight Night 198. He won the bout via unanimous decision.

Brady faced Belal Muhammad on October 22, 2022 at UFC 280. He lost the bout via TKO stoppage at the end of the second round.

Bardy was scheduled to face Michel Pereira on March 25, 2023, at UFC on ESPN 43.  However, Brady pulled out in mid-February due to a tore groin and the bout was scrapped.

Professional grappling career
Brady faced two-time ADCC Submission Fighting World Championship silver medallist Craig Jones at Fury Pro Grappling 3 on December 30, 2021 and won the match by unanimous decision.

Brady faced UFC veteran and 10th Planet Jiu-Jitsu black belt Ben Saunders in the main event of Fury Pro Grappling 4 on May 28, 2022 and submitted him with a kimura at 4:25.

Championships and accomplishments
Ultimate Fighting Championship
Performance of the Night (One time) 

MMAjunkie.com
2020 August Submission of the Month vs. Christian Aguilera

 Cage Fury Fighting Championships
 Cage Fury FC Welterweight Championship (One Time)
Two successful title defenses

Mixed martial arts record

|-
|Loss
|align=center|15–1
|Belal Muhammad
|TKO (punches)
|UFC 280
|
|align=center|2
|align=center|4:47
|Abu Dhabi, United Arab Emirates
|
|-
|Win
|align=center|15–0
|Michael Chiesa
|Decision (unanimous)
|UFC Fight Night: Vieira vs. Tate
|
|align=center|3
|align=center|5:00
|Las Vegas, Nevada, United States
|
|-
|Win
|align=center|14–0
|Jake Matthews
|Submission (arm-triangle choke)
|UFC 259
|
|align=center|3
|align=center|3:28
|Las Vegas, Nevada, United States
|
|-
| Win
| align=center|13–0
| Christian Aguilera
| Technical Submission (guillotine choke)
| UFC Fight Night: Smith vs. Rakić
| 
| align=center|2
| align=center|1:47
| Las Vegas, Nevada, United States
|
|-
| Win
| align=center| 12–0
| Ismail Naurdiev
| Decision (unanimous)
|UFC Fight Night: Benavidez vs. Figueiredo 
|
|align=center|3
|align=center|5:00
|Norfolk, Virginia, United States
|
|-
| Win
| align=center|11–0
| Court McGee
| Decision (unanimous)
|UFC on ESPN: Reyes vs. Weidman 
|
|align=center|3
|align=center|5:00
|Boston, Massachusetts, United States
|
|-
| Win
| align=center|10–0
| Tajuddin Abdul Hakim
| TKO (punches)
| CFFC 72
| 
| align=center|4
| align=center|3:36
| Atlantic City, New Jersey, United States
|
|-
| Win
| align=center|9–0
| Gilbert Urbina
| Decision (unanimous)
| LFA 49
| 
| align=center| 3
| align=center| 5:00
| Atlantic City, New Jersey, United States
|
|-
| Win
| align=center|8–0
| Colton Smith
| Decision (unanimous)
| Shogun Fights: Florida
| 
| align=center| 3
| align=center| 5:00
| Hollywood, Florida, United States
|
|-
| Win
| align=center| 7–0
| Mike Jones
| Submission (rear-naked choke)
| CFFC 68
| 
| align=center|2
| align=center|1:31
| Atlantic City, New Jersey, United States
|
|-
| Win
| align=center| 6–0
| Tanner Saraceno
| Submission (guillotine choke)
| CFFC 65
|
|align=Center|1
|align=center|3:36
|Philadelphia, Pennsylvania, United States
|
|-
| Win
| align=center| 5–0
| Chauncey Foxworth
| KO (spinning backfist)
| CFFC 60
| 
| align=center| 1
| align=center| 0:57
| Atlantic City, New Jersey, United States
| 
|-
| Win
| align=center| 4–0
| Rocky Edwards
| Decision (unanimous)
| CFFC 56
| 
| align=center| 3
| align=center| 5:00
| Philadelphia, Pennsylvania, United States
| 
|-
| Win
| align=center| 3–0
| Aaron Jeffery
| Decision (unanimous)
| CFFC 53
| 
| align=center| 3
| align=center| 5:00
| Philadelphia, Pennsylvania, United States
| 
|-
| Win
| align=center| 2–0
| Jake Gombocz
| Decision (unanimous)
| CFFC 48
| 
| align=center| 3
| align=center| 5:00
| Atlantic City, New Jersey, United States
|
|-
| Win
| align=center| 1–0
| Paul Almquist
| TKO (punches)
| CFFC 38
| 
| align=center| 1
| align=center| 0:33
| Atlantic City, New Jersey, United States
|

See also 
 List of current UFC fighters
 List of male mixed martial artists

References

External links 
  
 

1992 births
Living people
American male mixed martial artists
Welterweight mixed martial artists
Mixed martial artists utilizing Muay Thai
Mixed martial artists utilizing Brazilian jiu-jitsu
Ultimate Fighting Championship male fighters
Sportspeople from Philadelphia
Mixed martial artists from Pennsylvania
American Muay Thai practitioners
American practitioners of Brazilian jiu-jitsu
People awarded a black belt in Brazilian jiu-jitsu